Something new may refer to:

Film and television
 Something New (film), a 2006 romantic comedy
 Something New (How I Met Your Mother)
 "Something New", a 2007 episode of Brothers & Sisters
 Something New, a 1920 silent film starring Nell Shipman

Music

Albums
 Something New (Beatles album), 1964
 Something New (Sam Jones album), 1979
 Something New (EP), a 2018 mini album by Taeyeon

Songs
 "Something New" (Axwell & Ingrosso song), 2014
 "Something New" (Girls Aloud song), 2012
 "Something New" (Nikki Yanofsky song), 2014
 "Something New" (Wiz Khalifa song), 2017
 "Something New" (Zendaya song), 2016
 "Something New", by Dance Gavin Dance from Instant Gratification, 2015
 "Something New", by Hanson from MMMBop, 1996
 "Something New", by K. Michelle from All Monsters Are Human, 2020
 "Something New", by Set it Off, 2016
 "Something New", by Tokio Hotel from Dream Machine, 2016

Other uses
 Something Fresh, a novel by P. G. Wodehouse first published in the U.S. as Something New
 Something New (political party), a political party in the United Kingdom

See also
 Something (disambiguation)
 Something Blue (disambiguation)
 Something Borrowed (disambiguation)
 Something old